Ann Jillian (born Ann Jura Nauseda; January 29, 1950) is a retired American actress and singer whose career began as a child actress in 1960. She is best known for her role as the sultry Cassie Cranston on the 1980s sitcom It's a Living.

Early life and career

Jillian was born in Cambridge, Massachusetts, in 1950 to Lithuanian immigrant parents Juozas and Margarita Nauseda (later George and Margaret Nauseda)  and speaks Lithuanian fluently. Jillian was raised as a devout Roman Catholic.

She began her career as a child actress in 1960 when she played Little Bo Peep in the Disney film Babes in Toyland. Jillian appeared as Dainty June in the Rosalind Russell-Natalie Wood movie version of Gypsy (1962). She had several television appearances in the 1960s and 1970s, becoming a regular on the 1960s sitcom Hazel (1965-66 season) and appearing in the 1963 Twilight Zone episode "Mute" (where she was given screen credit as "Ann Jilliann") as the mute telepath Ilse Nielson. In 1983, Jillian was honored by the Young Artist Foundation with its Former Child Star "Lifetime Achievement" Award recognizing her achievements within the entertainment industry as a child actress.

Jillian moved on to voice roles, for Scooby-Doo, Where Are You! and Sealab 2020 in the early 1970s, but — told she was too old to play youthful roles of the day and too young to play a leading lady — there was no more work for her in Hollywood. She took a department store job and studied psychology, but heeded the advice of casting director Hoyt Bowers and Walt Disney who had told her, "Whatever you do, keep working at your craft".

Jillian married Andy Murcia, a Chicago police sergeant, on March 27, 1978, and shortly thereafter Murcia retired to manage his wife's career.  Murcia later partnered with Joyce Selznick in management of Ann Jillian until Joyce died of breast cancer shortly after.

In the late 1970s, she toured in musical comedies including Sammy Cahn's Words and Music. After appearing with Mickey Rooney in the play Goodnight Ladies in Chicago, the producers cast Ann Jillian to appear in the original company of Sugar Babies on Broadway with Rooney and Ann Miller in 1979. She also starred in I Love My Wife at the Drury Lane Theatre in Chicago.

1980s fame

Jillian appeared in more than 25 films, mostly for television. Though she had nearly two decades' worth of film and television credits already, she first came to national prominence in the 1980s' series It's a Living, a sitcom that elevated Jillian to sex symbol status in 1980. She was the last to be signed onto this series and received last place billing. The sitcom aired for two seasons on ABC before being cancelled due to low ratings and was sold into syndication for the burgeoning cable television market. (The show became a surprise success in syndication.) Toward the end of her time on the series for the ABC run, she portrayed Mae West in a 1982 made-for-television film. Jillian was nominated for a lead actress Emmy and Golden Globe for her performance.

In 1983, she appeared in the John Hughes movie Mr. Mom with Michael Keaton and Teri Garr. The same year, she appeared in the miniseries Malibu, starring Kim Novak, Eva Marie Saint and James Coburn. That fall she starred on her own sitcom, Jennifer Slept Here, a variation on The Ghost & Mrs. Muir, with Jillian as the apparition in question. Jennifer Slept Here ended in 1984, enabling her to take a role in the miniseries Ellis Island. Dunaway and Vereen were nominated for Golden Globe Awards, and Jillian and Burton were nominated for Emmy Awards. 

Bob Hope selected her to appear in six of his television specials, including two entertaining U.S. troops stationed in Beirut (1984) and Saudi Arabia (1991). She displayed her athletic abilities on three Battle of the Network Stars specials and a Circus of the Stars special and appeared in the charity extravaganza Night of 100 Stars. She guest starred in television specials for Don Rickles (1986) and David Copperfield (1987) and was on the dais at The Dean Martin Celebrity Roast for Mr. T (1984). In 1985, she played The Red Queen to Carol Channing's White Queen in an all-star television musical adaptation of Lewis Carroll's Alice in Wonderland. The same year, the producers of It's a Living made the relatively unheard-of decision to resume production of the series, by then three years off the air, for first-run syndication, and Jillian was contractually obligated to return to the series. She later starred on the namesake series Ann Jillian, which aired 13 episodes on NBC during the 1989–90 season. In 1994, she played the mother of an unborn child with a heart defect in Heart of a Child.

Personal life

Family and later work
Jillian gave birth to her only child, a son, Andrew Joseph Murcia, in 1992. She continued to act, with ten TV movie roles throughout the 1990s, although her television and film credits became sporadic since the late 1990s, as she decided to devote herself to raising her son and to promoting breast cancer issues. Today, she mostly works as a motivational speaker and also performs as a singer in corporate and symphony "pops" circles, conducted by Judith Morse. She is an occasional guest columnist for the website TheColumnists.com. She resides with her family in the Greater Los Angeles area.

On September 12, 2015, Jillian was inducted into the National Lithuanian American Hall of Fame.

Cancer
Before resuming production on It's a Living in 1985, Jillian (then 35) made headlines when she was diagnosed with breast cancer, and she became a vocal advocate for cancer research and prevention. Leaving It's a Living after the 1985–86 season, she focused on beating her cancer, with treatment including a double mastectomy. Her battle with cancer was chronicled in the top-rated made-for-TV film, The Ann Jillian Story (1988), in which Jillian portrayed herself. The film required two years to be produced, due to conflicts in tone, the degree of medical information included, and the relatively limited, realistic reaction portrayed by Jillian and her stage husband, before and after her surgery. Jillian received her third Emmy Award nomination, for Outstanding Lead Actress in a Miniseries or a Special, and won a 1989 Golden Globe Award for Best Performance by an Actress in a Mini-Series or Motion Picture Made for TV.

Filmography

References

External links

 
 
 
 
 

1950 births
Living people
Actresses from Cambridge, Massachusetts
American child actresses
American television actresses
American voice actresses
American film actresses
American musical theatre actresses
American people of Lithuanian descent
Best Miniseries or Television Movie Actress Golden Globe winners
Catholics from Massachusetts
20th-century American actresses
21st-century American actresses
United Service Organizations entertainers